is a Japanese voice actor affiliated to Arts Vision.

Biography
To commemorate twenty years of his debut, a book entitled  released on May 16, 2016. He created his YouTube channel  on March 19, 2020.

Filmography

Anime television series
1997
Remi, Nobody's Girl – Henry, Sailor B, Subordinate, Porters
Slayers TRY – Lizardman
The King of Braves GaoGaiGar – Driver

1998
DT Eightron – Garfy's Member, Waiter
Gandalla (Nessa no Haou Gandalla) – Man B, Subordinates
Marvelous Melmo – Shikaku, Boy, Announcer, Ikehara, TV-Analyst, Inkichi, Banchō, Jirō
Nazca – Delinquent, Soldier
Outlaw Star – Prisoner

1999
Di Gi Charat – Rik Heisenberg

2000
Saiyuki Reload: Burial – Kenyuu

2001
Captain Tsubasa Road to 2002 – Adult Tarō Misaki
Prétear – Hayate
The Prince of Tennis – Kiyosumi Sengoku

2002
Naruto – Kiba Inuzuka

2003
Bobobo-bo Bo-bobo – Takashi
Hungry Heart: Wild Striker – Kanō Kyōsuke
Zatch Bell! – Uri
Peacemaker Kurogane – Tōdō Heisuke
Papuwa – Shintaro

2004
Transformers: Energon – Hot ShotYakitate!! Japan – Go Chimatsuri

2005Aria – ArashiBasilisk: Kouga Ninpou Chou – Kouga GennosukeElemental Gelade – GrayartsTo Heart 2 – Yuji Kousaka

2006009-1 – BorzovBakumatsu Kikansetsu Irohanihoheto – Kanna SakyōnosukeBlack Blood Brothers – ZazaCrash B-Daman – Kyousuke ArasakiMakai Senki Disgaea – KurtisOuran High School Host Club – Akira KomatsuzawaPrincess Princess – Masayuki KoshinoPumpkin Scissors – Warrant Officer OreldoSaiunkoku Monogatari – Sa Kokujun

2007Bleach – Szayel Aporro GrantzDarker than Black – Yutaka KōnoHayate the Combat Butler – Himuro SaekiMajin Tantei Nōgami Neuro – Jun IshigakiNaruto: Shippuden – Kiba InuzukaRomeo x Juliet – CurioSaiunkoku Monogatari Second Series – Sa Kokujun

2008Junjou Romantica – Haruhiko UsamiRosario + Vampire – Kozo KasaharaRosario + Vampire Capu2 – Kozo Kasahara

200915 Bishoujo Hyouryuuki – Shiraishi KazumaHayate the Combat Butler!! – Himuro SaekiGokujō!! Mecha Mote Iinchō – Fulansuowa-samaPandora Hearts – Raven/Gilbert NightrayHey, Class President! – Kokusai Yuuzo

2010A Certain Magical Index II – Saiji TatemiyaBroken Blade – GirgeHakuouki – Saitou HajimeHakuouki: Hekketsu Roku – Saitou HajimeMaid Sama! – Soutarou KanouNura: Rise of the Yokai Clan – KurotaboThe Tyrant Falls in Love – Tetsuhiro MorinagaTogainu no Chi – Akira

2011Heart no Kuni no Alice – Sidney BlackHakuouki Sekkaroku – Saitou HajimeKaiji: Against All Rules – Hiromitsu IshidaNura: Rise of the Yokai Clan: Demon Capital – KurotaboTowa no Quon – Cyborg Epsilon AKA Shun KazamiToriko – MatchUta no Prince-sama maji Love 1000% (Season 1), Aijima Cecil

2012Ai no Kusabi Remake – GaiAquarion Evol – Andy W. HoleCross Fight B-Daman eS – Drive=GaruburnDog Days – Valério CalvadosFrom the New World – InuiGinga e Kickoff!! – Tanaka SatoruHakuouki: Reimei Roku – Saitou HajimeKimi to Boku 2 – Kouichi AzumaKingdom - Ping WeiKuroko's Basketball – Kōsuke WakamatsuMobile Suit Gundam AGE – Asemu Asuno/Captain AshRock Lee & His Ninja Pals – Kiba InuzukaSengoku Collection, Seiichi ŌtaThe New Prince of Tennis – Kiyosumi Sengoku

2013Brothers Conflict – Asahina Azusa Diabolik Lovers,– Sakamaki ShuuDiamond no Ace,– Manaka KanameDanganronpa: The Animation – Kiyotaka IshimaruGinga Kikoutai Majestic Prince – Visconti GiulianoKuroko's Basketball 2 — Kōsuke WakamatsuMakai Ouji: Devils and Realist – Gilles de RaisNagi no Asukara – Uroko-samaNeppu Kairiku Bushi Road – Shin KazusaUta no Prince-sama Maji Love 2000% (Season 2), Aijima Cecil Yowamushi Pedal – Imaizumi ShunsukeWatamote – Ishimine Jun

2014Aldnoah.Zero – Sōma YagaraiBaby Steps – Ryuuhei AoiBlack Bullet – Rand Ayn Broken Blade – GirgeCross Ange – Julio Asuka MisurugiDonten ni Warau – Abeno SouseiGugure! Kokkuri-san – TenguKnights of Sidonia – Tsuruuchi Kouichi Nagi no Asukara – Uroko-samaPokémon: XY – Saizō Psycho-Pass 2 – Mukoujima Riku, YomogidaRyūgajō Nanana no Maizōkin – Todomatsu ShuuShounen Hollywood: Holly Stage for 49 – Hayamizu Shiima Tokyo Ghoul – Asaki FueguchiYowamushi Pedal : GRANDE ROAD – Imaizumi Shunsuke

2015Aikatsu! 2 – SunnyAkagami no Shirayuki-hime – ChairmanAldnoah.Zero 2 – Sōma YagaraiThe Heroic Legend of Arslan – RajendraBaby Steps Season 2 – Ryuhei AoiBinan Koukou Chikyuu Bouei-bu LOVE! – Igarao OyajiDog Days – Valério CalvadosDiabolik Lovers, More Blood – Sakamaki ShuuDiamond no Ace -SECOND SEASON-– Manaka KanameFairy Tail – AcnologiaHokuto no Ken: Ichigo Aji – ReiJunjou Romantica 3 – Haruhiko UsamiKuroko's Basketball 3 — Kōsuke WakamatsuMeitantei Conan – Makabe Jun (Episode 795)Makura no Danshi – Mochizuki ShirisuMobile Suit Gundam: Iron-Blooded Orphans – Naze TurbineOne-Punch Man – Flashy FlashShounen Hollywood: Holly Stage for 50 – Hayamizu Shiima Star-Myu – Christian Leon YuzurihaSidonia no Kishi: Dai-kyū Wakusei Sen'eki – Tsuruuchi KouichiQ Transformers: Return of the Mystery of Convoy – Red Alert – SarurīmanUta no Prince-sama Maji Love Revolutions (Season 3) – Aijima CecilYowamushi Pedal: Re:ROAD – Imaizumi Shunsuke

2016Active Raid: Kidou Kyoushuushitsu Dai Hachi Gakari – Namihei Sado/Kyokai-sanActive Raid: Kidou Kyoushuushitsu Dai Hachi Gakari (Second Season) – Namihei Sado/Kyokai-sanThe Heroic Legend of Arslan: Dust Storm Dance – RajendraB-Project: Kodou*Ambitious - Yashamaru SakutarouClassicaloid – ChopinDimension W – Salva-Enna-TibestiDivine Gate – LancelotEndride – EljuiaHitori no Shita the outcast – Chō ReiyuHakuouki: Otogisoushi – Saitou HajimeKindaichi Shounen no Jikenbo R (Season 2) – Momose Shinpei (Episode 44)Luck & Logic – LuciferMobile Suit Gundam: Iron-Blooded Orphans S2 – Naze TurbineSousei no Onmyouji — Arata InanakiTsukiuta. The Animation — Mutsuki HajimeTouken Ranbu: Hanamaru — Mikazuki Munechika (ep.5 - )Uta no Prince-sama Maji LOVE Legend Star (Season 4) — Aijima CecilUdon no Kuni no Kiniro Kemari – Saeki ManabuWWW.Working!! – Sakaki Kenichirō

2017Black Clover - Nozel Silva,One Piece - Stelly (adult)Room Mate - Miyasaka ShinyaStar-Myu: High School Star Musical 2 (Lion Christian Yuzuriha)Saga of Tanya the Evil – Salaryman ("Tanya Degurechaff" Before Incarnation) (ep.2)Yowamushi Pedal NEW GENERATION – Imaizumi ShunsukeKirakira PreCure a la Mode – Prince NataKatsugeki/Touken Ranbu – Mikazuki Munechika6 Lovers - Yuuzou KokusaiSengoku Night Blood - Uesugi KenshinDies Irae - Ren Fujii/MercuriusIkemen Sengoku:Toki Wo Kakeru ga Hajimarinai - Hideyoshi Toyotomi

2018Yowamushi Pedal GLORY LINE – Imaizumi ShunsukeHitori no Shita the outcast – Chō ReiyuHakyuu Houshin Engi -  ShinkohyouTouken Ranbu: Hanamaru 2 - Mikazuki MunechikaPop Team Epic - Pipimi (Episode 7)Legend of the Galactic Heroes: Die Neue These – Ivan KonevCute High Earth Defense Club HAPPY KISS! – Unazuki TaijyuRokuhōdō Yotsuiro Biyori – Eisuke KadosakiHigh School DxD Hero – Cao CaoDakaichi – Kazuomi UsakaAikatsu Friends! – Mushirō HaryūJoJo's Bizarre Adventure: Golden Wind – Guido Mista / Sex PistolsIngress – Liu Tien HuaGaikotsu Shotenin Honda-san – WholesalerPhantom in the Twilight - BackupCells at Work - Bacillus Cereus

2019Meiji Tokyo Renka – Otojirō KawakamiThe Rising of the Shield Hero – Shirono Mamoru (Previous Shield Hero)Endro! – FishermanOne-Punch Man 2 – Flashy FlashEnsemble Stars! – Madara MikejimaBeyblade Burst GT - Blind DeVoyKochoki: Wakaki Nobunaga – Hayashi MichitomoStand My Heroes PIECE OF TRUTH – Watabe SatoruThe Disastrous Life of Saiki K.: Reawakened – Takumi Iguchi

2020Drifting Dragons – BerkoHaikyū!! To The Top – Kiyoomi SakusaA Destructive God Sits Next to Me – Shikimi TokimuneCagaster of an Insect Cage – PetrovArte – YuriTsukiuta. The Animation 2 — Mutsuki HajimeDeca-Dence – MinatoRe:Zero − Starting Life in Another World – Kenichi NatsukiThe Misfit of Demon King Academy – Ydol AnzeoFire Force Season 2 – HajikiDetective Conan — Hiro Kamijo (Episode 987)

2021Gekidol – Hirokazu TakezakiMoriarty the Patriot – Von HerderKingdom Season 3 – SeikaiPretty Boy Detective Club – Rai FudatsukiHow Not to Summon a Demon Lord Ω – VishosHigehiro: After Being Rejected, I Shaved and Took in a High School Runaway – Issa OgiwaraMy Next Life as a Villainess: All Routes Lead to Doom! – Rufus BrodeMieruko-chan – Mamoru YotsuyaDeep Insanity: The Lost Child – Leslie Blanc

2022Requiem of the Rose King – Edward IV of YorkTrapped in a Dating Sim: The World of Otome Games Is Tough for Mobs – Jilk Fia MarmoriaSkeleton Knight in Another World – DillanLove All Play – Haruo ItachiShoot! Goal to the Future – Yoshiharu KuboReiwa no Di Gi Charat – Rik Heisenberg

2023Opus Colors – Togo TakiseThe Aristocrat's Otherworldly Adventure: Serving Gods Who Go Too Far – GalmDemon Slayer: Kimetsu no Yaiba – GyokkoThe Ancient Magus' Bride – Narcisse Maugham

2024Highspeed Etoile – Lorenzo M. Salvatore

OVA
1996Shinseki GPX Cyber Formula SAGA 「ROUND3 CRITICAL DAYS」 – Reporter

1997Princess Rouge – Ota Tsutomu

2003Hunter × Hunter: Greed Island – Goreinu

2004Hunter × Hunter: G.I. Final – Goreinu

2012Pokémon Mystery Dungeon: Gates to Infinity Animated Shorts - Umbreon

2013Yowamushi Pedal: Special Ride – Imaizumi Shunsuke

2014Juuza Engi: Engetsu Sangokuden - Gaiden Youzhou Genya – Sousou

2016
 Star-Myu: High School Star Musical (Lion Christian Yuzuriha)

ONA
2018Sword Gai - Hakim

Anime films
2012Road to Ninja: Naruto the Movie – Kiba InuzukaCode Geass: Boukoku no Akito 1 - Yokuryuu wa Maiorita – Anou Pierre

2013Hakuouki Movie 1: Kyoto Ranbu – Saitou HajimePersona 3 The Movie: No. 1, Spring of Birth – Iori JunpeiMobile Suit Gundam AGE: Memory of Eden - Captain Ash/Asemu Asuno
2014Hakuouki Movie 2: Shikon Soukyuu – Saitou HajimeKushimitama Samurai – YamiPersona 3 The Movie: No. 2, Midsummer Knight's Dream – Junpei IoriTHE LAST -NARUTO THE MOVIE-  – Kiba Inuzuka Yowamushi Pedal: Re:RIDE – Imaizumi Shunsuke

2015Code Geass: Boukoku no Akito 3 - Kagayaku Mono Ten yori Otsu – Anou PierreGekijōban Meiji Tokyo Renka: Yumihari no Serenade – Otojirō KawakamiPersona 3 The Movie: No. 3, Falling Down – Iori JunpeiSidonia no Kishi Movie – Tsuruuchi Kouichi Yowamushi Pedal Movie – Imaizumi ShunsukeYowamushi Pedal Re:ROAD – Imaizumi Shunsuke

2016Gekijōban Meiji Tokyo Renka: Hanakagami no Fantasia – Otojirō KawakamiKuroko no Basket Movie 1: Winter Cup Soushuuhen - Kage to Hikari – Wakamatsu KōsukePersona 3 The Movie: No. 4, Winter of Rebirth – Iori JunpeiYowamushi Pedal SPARE BIKE – Imaizumi Shunsuke

2017Kuroko's Basketball The Movie: Last Game — Kōsuke WakamatsuFairy Tail: Dragon Cry — Acnologia

2019Blackfox – KasumiMy Hero Academia: Heroes Rising – Mummy

2020WAVE!! Surfing Yappe!! – Hayamichi Inada

2021 Dakaichi: Spain Arc – Kazuomi Usaka

2022Uta no Prince-sama: Maji Love ST☆RISH Tours – Cecil Aijima

Puppet
2016Thunderbolt Fantasy Touriken Yuuki - Lǐn Xuě Yā (Rin Setsu A) / Lüè Fēng Qiè Chén (Ryō Fū Setsujin) / Guǐ Niǎo (Kichō)

2017Thunderbolt Fantasy: The Sword of Life and Death (Movie) - Lǐn Xuě Yā (Rin Setsu A) / Lüè Fēng Qiè Chén (Ryō Fū Setsujin) / Guǐ Niǎo (Kichō)

2018Thunderbolt Fantasy Touriken Yuuki 2 - Lǐn Xuě Yā (Rin Setsu A) / Lüè Fēng Qiè Chén (Ryō Fū Setsujin) / Guǐ Niǎo (Kichō)

2021Thunderbolt Fantasy Touriken Yuuki 3 - Lǐn Xuě Yā (Rin Setsu A) / Lüè Fēng Qiè Chén (Ryō Fū Setsujin) / Guǐ Niǎo (Kichō)

TokusatsuMirai Sentai Timeranger (2000) – Assaulter Borg (ep. 24)Kamen Rider Den-O (2007) – Anthopper Imagin Ari (Kirigiris Voiced by : Tomokazu Seki) (ep.31-32)Kamen Rider Decade (2009) – Buffalo Lord / Taurus Ballista (ep. 12 - 13)Cho Kamen Rider Den-O & Decade Neo Generations: The Onigashima Warship (2009) – Gelnewt (Voiced by : Nobuyuki Hiyama, Yoshimasa Tanno)Kamen Rider × Kamen Rider × Kamen Rider The Movie: Cho-Den-O Trilogy - Episode Red (2010) – Anthopper Imagin Ari, Piggies Imagin (Second Son (Voiced by : Kazuya Nakai (Eldest Son), Tetsuya Kakihara (Third Son))Kamen Rider OOO (2011) – Ei-Sai Yummy (ep. 23 - 24)Kaizoku Sentai Gokaiger (2011) – Vannain (ep. 31)Tokumei Sentai Go-Busters (2012) – Rhino Doubler (ep. 31 - 32)Zyuden Sentai Kyoryuger (2013) – Debo Kokodoko (ep. 8)Ressha Sentai ToQger (2014) – Rainbow Line President (eps. 31 - 32, 35, 44, 47)Ressha Sentai ToQger vs. Kyoryuger: The Movie (2015) – Rainbow Line President

DubbingThe Final Girls – Chris Briggs (Alexander Ludwig)Jeepers Creepers – Darry Jenner (Justin Long)The Last King of Scotland – Nicholas Garrigan (James McAvoy)The Perfect Host – John Taylor (Clayne Crawford)Princess Hours – Lee Yul (Kim Jeong-hoon)Step Up Revolution – Eddy (Misha Gabriel)You Got Served – David (Omarion)

GameAnother Eden - EwanArknights -  Broca Akane-sasu Sekai de Kimi to Utau – Abe no SeimeiAtelier Ayesha: The Alchemist of Dusk – Juris GrundenBaten Kaitos: Eternal Wings and the Lost Ocean – KalasBeast Master & Prince – AlfredBlazBlue: Cross Tag Battle – GordeauBlaze Union: Story to Reach the Future – GarlotBrothers Conflict: Passion Pink – Asahina Azusa Brothers Conflict: Brilliant Blue – Asahina Azusa Captain Tsubasa: Dream Team – Ramon VictorinoClock Zero – Hanabusa Madoka/BishopCode Vein – Yakumo ShinonomeDiabolik Lovers – Sakamaki ShuuDiamond no Kuni no Alice ~Wonderful Wonder World~ – Sidney BlackDiamond no Kuni no Alice ~Wonderful Mirror World~ – Sidney BlackDisgaea – KurtisDies Irae – Fujii RenDangan Ronpa: Academy of Hope and High School Students of Despair – Kiyotaka IshimaruDragon Ball Xenoverse – DemigraDynasty Warriors 8 – Li Dian
Ensemble Stars – Mikejima MadaraEstpolis: The Lands Cursed by the Gods – IduraEtrian Odyssey Untold: The Millennium Girl – HeroFate/Extra – Archer/Robin HoodFate/Grand Order – Asterios, Robin HoodFinal Fantasy XIV - Zenos Yae GalvusFushigi Yūgi: Suzaku Ibun – TasukiGakuen Club – Takizawa SakuGakuen Heaven 2: Double Scramble (2014) – Masatsugu TakatoGenshin Impact (2020) – KaeyaGranblue Fantasy – Mikazuki Munechika, Isaac
Grand Chase: Dimensional Chaser (2018) – Rufus WildeHakuōki Shinsengumi Kitan (PS2) (2008) – Saitou HajimeHakuōki Portable (PSP) (2009) – Saitou HajimeHakuōki Zuisouroku (PS2) (2009) – Saitou HajimeHakuōki Zuisouroku Portable (PSP) (2010) – Saitou HajimeHakuōki Shinsengumi Kitan (Mobile Game) (2010) – Saitou HajimeHakuōki DS (Nintendo DS) (2010) – Saitou HajimeHakuōki Junsouroku (PS3) (2010) – Saitou HajimeHakuōki Reimeiroku (PS2) (2010) – Saitou HajimeHakuōki Yuugiroku (PSP) (2010) – Saitou HajimeHakuōki 3D (Nintendo 3DS) (2011) – Saitou HajimeHakuōki Reimeiroku Portable (PSP) (2011) – Saitou HajimeHakuōki Yuugiroku DS (Nintendo DS) (2011) – Saitou HajimeHakuōki Zuisouroku DS (Nintendo DS) (2011) – Saitou HajimeHakuōki Reimeiroku DS (Nintendo DS) (2012) – Saitou HajimeHakuōki Reimeiroku Nagorigusa (PS3) (2012) – Saitou HajimeHakuōki SSL ~Sweet School Life~ (PS Vita) (2014) – Saitou HajimeHakuōki Reimeiroku Omohase Sora (PS Vita) (2015) – Saitou HajimeHakuōki Shinkai (PS Vita) (2015) – Saitou HajimeHakuōki Zuisouroku Omokage Hana (PS Vita) (2015) – Saitou HajimeHarukanaru Toki no Naka de 3: Izayoiki – Fujiwara no YasuhiraHeart no Kuni no Alice – Sidney BlackHyakka Hyakurou Sengoku Ninpou-chou aka Nightshade (2016)– Chojiro MomochiI/O – Kosuke MiyataJoJo's Bizarre Adventure: All Star Battle R – Guido MistaJoJo's Bizarre Adventure: Last Survivor – Guido MistaJyuzaengi Engetsu Sangokuden (PSP) – "Sou Sou"Lucian Bee's Resurrection Supernova – ViolaLucian Bee's Justice Yellow – ViolaLucian Bee's Evil Violet – ViolaLuminous Arc – HeathMega Man 11 – Acid ManMermaid PrismMobile Suit Gundam Battlefield Record U.C. 0081 – Fritz BauerMoujuutsukai to Oujisama – AlfredNamco × Capcom – Strider Hiryu, Strider HienOnmyōji – OnikiriPachi-Slot Tekken 4 – Claudio SerafinoPersona 2: Innocent Sin – Eikichi MishinaPersona 3 – Junpei IoriPersona 4 Arena Ultimax – Junpei IoriPersona Q: Shadow of the Labyrinth – Junpei IoriPokémon Masters – TakeshiProject X Zone – Yuri LowellProject X Zone 2 – Yuri Lowell, Strider HiryuRune Factory 4 - LeonSamurai Love Ballad: PARTY - Sanada NobuyukiSengoku Night Blood - Uesugi KenshinSeveral Shades of Sadism (SSS) – Toma KiraShinobi – ShiroganeShinobi, Koi Utsutsu – Sanada YukikageShiritsu Berubara Gakuen ~ Berusaiyu no Bara Re* imajineishon ~ (2019) - Philippe Hanson Sol Trigger – FarelSoul Nomad & the World Eaters – EndorphSoulcalibur II – Hong Yun-seongSoulcalibur III – Hong Yun-seongSoulcalibur III: Arcade Edition – Hong Yun-seongSoulcalibur IV – Hong Yun-seongSoulcalibur: Broken Destiny – Hong Yun-SeongStreet Fighter Alpha 3 – Fei LongStreet Fighter V - NashStrider 2 – Strider HiryuSuper Smash Bros. for Nintendo 3DS and Wii U – Little MacSuper Smash Bros. Ultimate - Little MacTales of Vesperia – Yuri LowellTenshou Gakuen Gekkou Hasumi – Kyouragi TakashiTo Heart 2 – Yūji KōsakaTokimeki Restaurant – Date Kyoya (X.I.P Leader)Touken Ranbu - Mikazuki MunechikaUltimate Marvel vs. Capcom 3 – Phoenix WrightUnder Night In-Birth – GordeauUta no Prince-sama – Aijima CecilVitaminX – Nanase ShunVitaminX Evolution – Nanase ShunVitaminZ – Nanase ShunVitaminZ Evolution – Nanase ShunVitaminXtoZ – Nanase ShunYume100 Prince – Haku & RavenZettai Zetsumei Toshi 3 – Naoki KousakaYakuza: Like a Dragon – Masato Arakawa / Ryo AokiZone of the Enders – Slash, Corporal, Boy APokémon Masters EX'' – Raihan

References

External links

 Kōsuke Toriumi at GamePlaza-Haruka Voice Acting Database 
 Kōsuke Toriumi at Hitoshi Doi's Seiyuu Database

1973 births
Male voice actors from Kanagawa Prefecture
Japanese male video game actors
Japanese male voice actors
Living people
People from Chigasaki, Kanagawa
20th-century Japanese male actors
21st-century Japanese male actors
Arts Vision voice actors
Japanese YouTubers